Chennas Narayanan Namboodiripad (born 1428) was a 15th-century mathematician and Tantra ritualist from Kerala, India.

Narayanan Namboodiripad was considered to be an authority in the fields of Vaasthusaastram (Indian Architecture), Mathematics and Tantram. He authored a book titled Thanthra Samuchayam which is still considered as the authentic reference manual in the field of temple architecture and rituals.

Other contributions to mathematics include:

 A method of arriving at a circle starting with a square, and successively making it a regular octagon, a regular 16-sided, a 32-sided, 64-sided polygons, etc.
 Co-ordinate system of fixing points in a plane.
 Converting a square to a regular hexagon having approximately equal area.
 Finding the width of a regular octagon, given the perimeter.

References
https://www.namboothiri.com/articles/thanthram.htm

See also
Indian Mathematics

Scientists from Kerala
1428 births
Year of death missing
Kerala school of astronomy and mathematics
15th-century Indian mathematicians